The Honda turbocharged Indy V8 engine is a single-turbocharged, 2.65-liter, V-8 Indy car racing engine, originally designed, developed and produced by Honda, in partnership with Judd, for use in the CART PPG Indy Car World Series; between 1986 and 2002.

Background
As a result of Jack Brabham's long-standing relationship with Honda, Judd was hired by them to develop an engine for the company's return to Formula Two in association with Ron Tauranac's Ralt team.

After the demise of Formula Two at the end of the 1984 season, Judd continued to develop new engines for Honda.  The first was the Judd AV, a turbocharged V8 engine built for Honda's CART campaign. It was first used on the CART circuit midway through the 1986 season, fielded by Galles Racing and driver Geoff Brabham. It was initially badged as the Brabham-Honda, and scored a fourth-place finish at the 1986 Michigan 500. In 1987, the engine was used for the first time at the Indianapolis 500. Brabham scored second-place finishes in 1987 at Pocono and Road America, as well as a third at the season finale at Miami.

The engine became known for its reliability and superior fuel mileage (particularly in the 500-mile races). However, it was at a decided power disadvantage compared to the top engine of the time, the Ilmor Chevrolet.

In 1988, Truesports with driver Bobby Rahal took over as the primary team, and the "Honda" name was dropped from the powerplant. During the 1988 season.

Applications
Lola T86/00
March 87C
Lola T9400
Reynard 95I
Reynard 96I
Lola T96/00
Reynard 97I
Lola T97/00
Reynard 98I
Reynard 99I
Reynard 2KI
Reynard 01I
Reynard 02I
Lola B02/00

References

Engines by model
Gasoline engines by model
Honda engines
IndyCar Series
Champ Car
V8 engines
Honda in motorsport